Erastria coloraria, the broad-lined erastria, is a species of moth in the family Geometridae (geometrid moths), in the superfamily Geometroidea (geometrid and swallowtail moths). The species was described by Johan Christian Fabricius in 1798. It is found in North America.

The MONA or Hodges number for Erastria coloraria is 6704.

References

Further reading
 Ross H. Arnett. (2000). American Insects: A Handbook of the Insects of America North of Mexico. CRC Press.
 Scoble, Malcolm J., ed. (1999). Geometrid Moths of the World: A Catalogue (Lepidoptera, Geometridae). 1016.

External links
Butterflies and Moths of North America

Geometridae